, is also known as Aso Volcano and in this sense is the largest active volcano in Japan, and is among the largest in the world. Common use relates often only to the somma volcano in the centre of the Aso Caldera. It stands in Aso Kujū National Park in Kumamoto Prefecture, on the island of Kyushu.

Geography 

The central cone group of Aso consists of five peaks, often called the "Five Mountains of Aso" (阿蘇五岳): Mt. Neko, Mt. Taka (also called Takadake or Taka-Dake), Mt. Naka (also called Nakadake or Naka-Dake), Mt. Eboshi, and Mt. Kishima (also called  Kishimadake or Kishima-Dake ). The highest point is the summit of Mt. Taka, at 1592 m above sea level. The crater of Mt. Naka, the west side of which is accessible by road, contains an active volcano which continuously emits smoke and has occasional eruptions. Only the northernmost crater (the first crater) has been active for the last 70 years—1974, 1979, 1984–1985, 1989–1991, 2009, 2011, 2015, 2016 and 2021.

The present Aso Caldera formed as a result of four huge caldera eruptions occurring over a range of 90,000–300,000 years ago. The caldera, one of the largest in the world, contains the city of Aso as well as Takamori and Minamiaso enclosing the caldera extends about 18 km east to west and about 25 km north to south. Viewpoints from the somma overlooking the caldera are perched upon lava formed before the volcanic activity which created the present caldera. Ejecta from the huge caldera eruption 90,800 years ago covers more than 600 km3 and roughly equals the volume of Mount Fuji; with a pyroclastic flow plateau that covered a significant part of Kyushu.

Volcanic ash from Mount Aso and Mount Kujū plays an important role in maintaining and replenishing the tidal flats of the Ariake Sea, which are among the largest in Japan. Several of the flats have been designated as Ramsar sites. The ash is carried from the volcanoes to the coastline by the Chikugo River, which has its source located on Aso as well.

History 

The eruption which formed the present somma occurred approximately 300,000 years ago. Four large-scale eruptions (Aso 1 – 4) occurred during a period extending from 300,000 to 90,000 years ago. As large amounts of pyroclastic flow and volcanic ash were emitted from the volcanic chamber, a huge depression (caldera) was formed as the chamber collapsed. The fourth eruption (Aso 4) was the largest, with volcanic ash covering the entire Kyushu region and even extending to Yamaguchi Prefecture.

Mt. Taka, Mt. Naka, Mt. Eboshi, and Mt. Kishima are cones formed following the fourth above-mentioned huge caldera eruption. Mt. Naka remains active today. Aso's pyroclastic flow deposits (welded tuff) were utilized for bridge construction in the region, There are approximately 320 arched stone bridges in Kumamoto Prefecture, including the Tsujun-kyo and Reitai-kyo bridges on the Midorikawa River, which are important national cultural properties.

A new eruption began at 11:43 a.m. on 20 October 2021.

Climate
Precipitation is high throughout the year, which brings the area to have borderline subtropical characteristics as well.

National Park
The mountain is a key feature that contributed to the original Aso National Park. Spectacular sights such as the seasonal flowering of Rhododendron kiusianum on the slopes of Takadake reflect significant protected botanical ecosystems.

Tourism
Aso has been considered as a sacred place since long time ago. It became a mountain for training and worship. Before the Meiji era, there was only one hiking path from Bauchuu, near the current Aso station.

Foreigners visited Mount Aso for the first time during Meiji era for tourism and research. A new hiking path from south of mountain became famous. As there were more and more local visitors.

During the Taishō era, the Miyaji line opened. There were more than 100,000 visitors every year. In 1934, the area was established as Aso National Park.

At the foot of the mountain there are also various campsites, and horse riding at Kusasenrigahama. There are also helicopter tours and bicycle tours.

Cable car 
A cable car system, the Mount Aso Ropeway, opened on 10 April, 1958 to provide access to the mountain. The system ran for the last time in August 2014, then closed due to higher volcanic alert level. In 2015, 2016, the system was damaged by volcanic ash and earthquake. It was totally dismantled in 2019. From February 2018, a shuttle bus runs from the original station, now Mount Aso terminal to the crater's edge .

Osen 
Because Mount Aso is a volcano, there are many onsen hot springs areas, such as Uchinomaki, Asoakamizu, Kurokawa.

Hiking 
Mt. Aso has numerous hiking trails leading to the interesting peaks and mountains around the crater. The Nakadake trail will take you to the highest peak which is part of the active crater and often closed when volcanic gas or volcanic activity is too high. The other surrounding trails offer enjoyable terrain and unique views over the grasslands, the Aso crater, and a small conical peak called Komezuka. Nearly all of the trails (excluding Nekodake) can be accessed from the bus stop at the museum.

In popular culture 
In Ishirō Honda's kaiju films, Mount Aso is home to the giant pteranodon creature Rodan. In Rodan, the creature and its mate perish in the volcano's eruption.

Mount Aso serves as the inspiration of Mt. Chimney in Pokémon Ruby and Sapphire, Pokémon Emerald and the remake Pokémon Omega Ruby and Alpha Sapphire.

In the manga Magical Girl Spec-Ops Asuka by Makoto Fukami and Seigo Tokiya, the final battle of the Distonian War that took place 3 years before the events of the series takes place on Mount Aso.

See also

 List of volcanoes in Japan
 Aso Shrine
 Aso Volcano Museum

References

General

Cited

External links 

 Asosan - Japan Meteorological Agency 
 Asosan: National catalogue of the active volcanoes in Japan - Japan Meteorological Agency
 Aso Volcano - Geological Survey of Japan
 Asosan - Smithsonian Institution: Global Volcanism Program
 Aso Geopark

Volcanoes of Kyushu
VEI-7 volcanoes
Active volcanoes
Subduction volcanoes
Calderas of Kyushu
Mountains of Kumamoto Prefecture
Complex volcanoes
Supervolcanoes
Volcanoes of Kumamoto Prefecture
Volcanic eruptions in 2021